Lake Malone State Park is a  state park located near Dunmor, Kentucky, in Muhlenberg County and extending into parts of Logan County and Todd County. In addition to the  Lake Malone, the natural features of the park include sandstone cliffs and a natural rock bridge.

Activities and amenities
The park features campsites, picnic areas, a swimming area, a boat ramp, and a dock.  The  Laurel Trail leads through a hardwood forest filled with mountain laurel, holly, dogwood, and wildflowers.  The adjacent Lake Malone is managed by the Kentucky Department of Fish and Wildlife and is popular with boaters and fishermen.

References

External links
Lake Malone State Park Kentucky State Parks 
Lake Malone Kentucky Department of Fish and Wildlife

State parks of Kentucky
Protected areas of Logan County, Kentucky
Protected areas of Muhlenberg County, Kentucky
Protected areas of Todd County, Kentucky